Geothermobacterium ferrireducens is a species of hyperthermophilic thermodesulfobacterium discovered and known exclusively from Obsidian Pool in Yellowstone National Park, Wyoming. Its name comes from the Latin ferrum, meaning Iron, and reducens, meaning conversion to a different state.
The bacteria are gram-negative rods, and move using a single flagellum. They live in high temperatures, between 65 and 100 °C, with 85 to 90 degrees being the optimum range- the highest optimum temperature range of any member of the phylum Bacteria. They are roughly 0.5 µm by 1.1 µm. They have an unusual biology: they do not require organic carbon for growth, instead growing by coupling hydrogen oxidation with a form of Fe(III) oxide reduction.

References 

Thermophiles
Biota of Wyoming